Unleavened bread is any of a wide variety of breads which are prepared without using rising agents such as yeast. Unleavened breads are generally flat breads; however, not all flat breads are unleavened.  Unleavened breads, such as the tortilla and roti, are staple foods in Central America and South Asia, respectively. Unleavened sacramental bread plays a major part in Christian liturgy and Eucharistic theology.

Religious significance

Unleavened breads have symbolic importance in Judaism and Christianity. Jews and Christians consume unleavened breads such as matzo during Passover and Eucharist, respectively, as commanded in Exodus 12:18. Per the Torah Old Testament, the newly emancipated Israelites had to leave Egypt in such a hurry that they could not so much as spare time for their breads to rise; as such, bread which before it can rise is eaten as a reminder.

Canon Law of the Latin Church of the Catholic Church mandates the use of unleavened bread for the Host, and unleavened wafers for the communion of the faithful. Some Protestant churches tend to follow the Latin Catholic practice, whereas others use either unleavened bread or wafers or ordinary (leavened) bread, depending on the traditions of their particular denomination or local usage.

On the other hand, most Eastern Churches explicitly forbid the use of unleavened bread (Greek: azymos artos) for the Eucharist. Eastern Christians associate unleavened bread with the Old Testament and allow only for bread with yeast, as a symbol of the New Covenant in Christ's blood. Indeed, this usage figures as one of the three points of contention that traditionally accounted as causes (along with the issues of Petrine supremacy and the filioque in the Niceno-Constantinopolitan Creed) of the Great Schism of 1054 between Eastern and Western churches.

Varieties of unleavened bread
Arboud - Unleavened bread made of wheat flour baked in the embers of a campfire, traditional among Arab Bedouin.
Arepa made of corn and corn flour, original from Colombia and Venezuela.
Bannock - Unleavened bread originating in the British isles.
Bataw – Unleavened bread made of barley, corn, or wheat, traditional in Egypt.
Kitcha – Ethiopian type of flat bread used mainly in the traditional fit-fit or chechebsa dish.
Lavash (usually leavened but occasionally unleavened) – Armenian flat bread inscribed on the UNESCO Intangible Cultural Heritage Lists
Matzo – Jewish flat bread
Piadina – from the Romagna historical region of Italy, made of wheat flour, lard or olive oil, water and salt. Up to the 1940s it could be up to 2 cm thick, while the variant of Rimini has always been much thinner.
Pizza dolce di Beridde – Unleavened sweet bread typical for the city of Rome. 
Rieska – Unleavened bread usually made of barley, traditional in the northern parts of Finland
Roti – Indian flat breads including Chapati, Dalpuri, and variants.
Tortilla – Mesoamerican/Mexican flat bread
Tortilla de rescoldo –  Chilean unleavened bread made of wheat flour, traditionally baked in the coals of a campfire.

See also
Passover

References

 
Biblical phrases